Muhammad ibn al-Hassan al-Bannani  (1727 – 1780 CE) (1133 AH – 1194 AH), more commonly referred to in books of Islamic law as al-Bannani or Imam al-Banani, was an 18th-century Muslim jurist from Fes, Morocco, and a scholar in the Maliki school of Islamic jurisprudence (fiqh).

Life

Al-Bannani was born in Fes in 1727, a city where he studied, lived for his entire life and was also buried in. He studied under many of the scholars of his time including al-Tayyib al-Wazzani and the Sufi Ahmad ibn al-Mubarak (author of Kitab al-Ibriz). After a period of study, he became the imam and khatib of the Karaouine mosque and university and also taught there. He died in 1780 CE and was buried next to another scholar of Fes, Muhammad Mayyara, in the Darb at-Taweel cemetery near the Karaouine mosque.

Al-Bannani is known for his book Al-Fath ar-Rabbani (The Endowment of Divine Grace). The text is a sub-commentary on the classical Mukhtassar (Concise Text) of Khalil (the main source of rulings in Maliki jurisprudence).

References 

1780 deaths
1727 births
18th-century Moroccan people
Moroccan imams
Moroccan Maliki scholars
Moroccan writers
People from Fez, Morocco
University of al-Qarawiyyin alumni
Moroccan jurists